This is a list of notable bow tie wearers, real and fictional; notable people for whom the wearing of a bow tie (when not in formal dress) is also a notable characteristic.

Bow tie wearing can be a notable characteristic for an individual. Men's clothier Jack Freedman told The New York Times that wearing a bow tie "is a statement maker" that identifies a person as an individual because "it's not generally in fashion". Numerous writers and bow tie sellers have observed that the popularity of this type of neckwear can rise and fall with the fortunes of the well-known people who wear them.

Until the 20th century, the bow tie was the general rule for neckties. Starting in early 20th century, the bow tie started to become more rare.

In 1996, The Wall Street Journal quoted statistics from the Neckwear Association of America showing that bow ties represent 3 percent of the 100 million ties sold each year in the United States, most of them part of formal wear, such as for white tie and black tie.

Attention to famous bow tie wearers in commerce and fashion commentary

Those who write about bow ties often mention famous people who wear or have worn them. These writers often make the point that the image conveyed to others by a bow tie can be affected by associations with celebrities and famous people in the past.

A common fashion accessory in the nineteenth century, the bow tie had positive associations by mid-twentieth century, bolstered by real-world personalities like President Franklin Roosevelt and the "political genius" Right Honourable Sir Winston Churchill as well as "devil-may-care" characters portrayed in films by actors like Humphrey Bogart and Frank Sinatra.  By the 1970s, however, the bow tie became associated with nerds and geeks, such as the slapstick characters played by Jerry Lewis, and Mayberry's fictional deputy sheriff, Barney Fife.  This perception was reinforced by the bow tie's association with Pee-wee Herman and U.S. Senator Paul Simon.

The perceptions associated with bow ties started to take another turn in the 1980s, when Success Magazine founder, W. Clement Stone, spoke out in support of the neck wear after the publication by fashion author John Molloy which observed, "Wear a bow tie and nobody will take you seriously."  Stone associated bow-tie wearing with virility, aggressiveness, and salesmanship.  In further defense of the bow tie, its use by figures such as Daniel Patrick Moynihan and Saul Bellow has been cited.

Celebrities' effect on bow-tie wearing

When a celebrity is noticed wearing a bow tie, it can affect bow tie sales; sales see an improvement when the accessory is associated with younger celebrities such as Tucker Carlson.  When Raj Bhakta wore one during his stint on The Apprentice, haberdashers reported customers asking for a bow tie which looked like his. Similarly, after Matt Smith made his debut as the bow tie-wearing Eleventh Doctor in Doctor Who, Topman reported a significant increase in demand for bow ties (from 3% of all tie sales to 14%).

Arthur M. Schlesinger Jr. wrote about his decision as a college student to start wearing bow ties in his memoir A Life in the Twentieth Century: Innocent Beginnings, 1917–1950.  Schlesinger remarked that he made his decision in part because a number of famous men he admired had a penchant for the neck wear.  In addition, he noted that they prevent dinner mishaps, saying, "It is impossible, or at least it requires extreme agility, to spill anything on a bow tie."

Commercial interests using famous wearers to encourage sales
Bow tie sellers often cite famous people who have worn the neckwear as a way of encouraging more customers. Jack Cutone, co-founder of Boston Bow Tie, noted that there is ample evidence to support the uniqueness and stature of those who wear bow ties, including Abraham Lincoln, Winston Churchill, Albert Einstein and Sigmund Freud.  Beau Ties Ltd., an online bow tie seller, has featured a "C. Everett Koop bow tie," complete with an endorsement by Koop, who was Surgeon General of the United States during the Reagan administration. Carrot & Gibbs, another bow tie seller, lists several famous wearers on its bow tie web page.

Bow tie wearers of the nineteenth century
Bow ties were conventional attire in the nineteenth century. Portraits of U.S. presidents from Van Buren through McKinley commonly show them in bow ties. Wearing of a bow tie was seldom commented upon and did not form part of the public perception of figures such as American inventor Thomas Edison .

Bow tie wearers in the twentieth and twenty-first centuries

Architects
 Le Corbusier (1887–1965), architect who wore "his trademark bow tie"
 Peter Eisenman (born 1932), architect and academic
 Walter Gropius (1883–1969), architect, six of whose bow ties are kept by Harvard
 Louis Kahn (1901/1902–1974), architect and academic
 Owen Luder (born 1928), architect

Educators

College and university professors
 Leon Botstein (born 1946), president of Bard College
 George S. Bridges, former Whitman College and current Evergreen State College president
 George Campbell Jr. (born 1945), president of Cooper Union
 James E. Cofer, Fulbright Scholar and President of Missouri State University and the University of Louisiana at Monroe.
 Donald J. Cram, chemist, Nobel Prize laureate.
 Angus Deaton, Dwight D. Eisenhower Professor of Economics and International Affairs Emeritus at the Woodrow Wilson School of Public and International Affairs and the Economics Department at Princeton University, Nobel Prize laureate
 William Durden, president of Dickinson College
 E. Gordon Gee (born 1944), president of West Virginia University and former president of Vanderbilt University, Brown University, the University of Colorado at Boulder, and Ohio State University: "When E. Gordon Gee was fifteen years old, he made a defining sartorial decision. He began wearing a bow tie."
 Alexander Fleming (1881–1955), Scottish biologist, pharmacologist, Nobel Prize laureate
Jerry Herron, dean of the Irvin D. Reid Honors College at Wayne State University
Richard Hofstadter, American historian
 Eric R. Kandel (born 1929), neurobiology professor and Nobel Prize winner with a "trademark bow tie"
 Fred Lazarus IV, president of the Maryland Institute College of Art
 Fritz Albert Lipmann, German-American biochemist, Nobel Prize laureate.
 William Lipscomb, physicist, Nobel Prize Laureate.
 R. Bowen Loftin (born 1949), chancellor of the University of Missouri. Quoted as saying "The similarity between Bowen and Bowtie tends to help people remember my name."
 Bohumil Makovsky, Director of Bands at Oklahoma A&M College
 Michael C. Maxey, 11th president of Roanoke College
Santa J. Ono (born 1962), President & Vice-Chancellor of The University of British Columbia, President Emeritus of University of Cincinnati, President of University of Michigan. Immunologist and vision researcher. 
Paul C. Pribbenow, president of Augsburg University, a private liberal arts institution in Minneapolis. Pribbenow holds a BA (1978) from Luther College (Iowa), and an MA (1979) and PhD (1993) in social ethics from the University of Chicago.
 Paul Samuelson (1915–2009), professor emeritus of economics at the Massachusetts Institute of Technology and a Nobel Prize winner.
 Erwin Schrödinger, father of quantum physics
 Andrew Sorensen, former president of the University of Alabama and the University of South Carolina, capitalized on his reputation for a "trademark bow tie" by calling his travels around South Carolina "Bow Tie Bus Tours".
 Eugene H. Spafford, cybersecurity pioneer, professor at Purdue University, and founder of the CERIAS research institute.
 Edward C. Taylor, Princeton University Professor of Chemistry and inventor of certain chemotherapeutic pharmaceuticals.
 Gary Weedman, 6th president of Johnson University
William E. Troutt, 19th president of Rhodes College in Memphis, Tennessee.

Other educators

 Daniel J. Boorstin (1914–2004), U.S. historian, professor, attorney, writer, U.S. Librarian of Congress 1975-1987
 Bill Nye (born 1955), television science program host, is a "gangly guy in the blue lab coat and bow tie". On why he wears bow ties: "If you're working with liquid nitrogen and your tie falls into it, it's funny in a way to the audience but it's also — pun intended — a little bit of a pain in the neck."
 Alexander Oparin (1894–1980), Soviet biochemist notable for his contributions to the theory of the origin of life
 Murray Rothbard (1926–1995), libertarian economist and historian who "always wore a conservative suit and bow tie."
 Arthur Schlesinger, Jr. (1917–2007), "famed for his trademark bow ties"
 Chris Whittle (born 1947), founder of Channel One News and Edison Schools
 Peter Morici (born 1948) economist, political commentator and Professor of International Business at the R.H. Smith School of Business at the University of Maryland, College Park.

Entertainers and media personalities

Comedians
 Fred Allen, American radio and TV comedian 
 Charlie Chaplin, renowned comic actor of the silent film era
 Fyvush Finkel, comedic actor best known for roles on TV series produced by David E. Kelley, sometimes nicknamed "Bowtie Finkel"
 Leo Gorcey as "Slip" Mahoney in The Bowery Boys film series (1946-1956).
 Pee-wee Herman, played by Paul Reubens
 Marc Evan Jackson, American comedian and actor, who "has played Sparks Nevada, Marshal on Mars wearing a bow tie invariably during every performance" as well as wearing them when he is out of character
 Stan Laurel, comedian, typically wore a bow tie when in character
 Jerry Lewis ("in nutty character")
 Groucho Marx, American comedian
David Mitchell, actor, comedian, and raconteur of Mitchell and Webb fame. David's bow ties were known as a source of amusement during his early career.
 Garry Moore, comedian who hosted game and variety shows, was known for his crew cut and bow ties
 Frank Muir, British comedy writer and broadcast personality "famous for his pink bow tie and mispronunciation", according to the BBC
 Mo Rocca, identified by the New York Times as one of several comedians who have worn bow ties "ironically"
 Mark Russell, American political comedian, pianist, and parody song author. "Mr. Russell knows from bow ties. They have been his signature for years, along with a star-spangled piano that he plinks every few minutes ..."
 Paul F. Tompkins, American comedian known for his dapper appearance on stage including a penchant for bow ties

Journalists and commentators
 Tucker Carlson, conservative American commentator In 2005 he told the New York Times he had consistently worn bow ties since childhood, but he acknowledged that bow ties often provoke negative reactions, "like a middle finger protruding from your neck." Following his tenure on CNN's Crossfire (Jon Stewart famously knocked the bow tie during his infamous 2004 appearance on the show), he has switched primarily to long neckties or no ties at all.
 John Daly, journalist and host of What's My Line?, was often photographed in a bow tie; evening dress (which included bow ties) was worn by the host and panelists on that game show
 Sir Robin Day (1923–2000), British television commentator and interviewer; his BBC News obituary said "With his thick horn-rimmed spectacles and trade mark polka-dot bow tie, he was the great inquisitor"
 Troy Dungan, retired chief weather anchor for WFAA-TV (ABC) in Dallas-Fort Worth, owns approximately 220 bow ties
 Dave Garroway (1913–1982), U.S. broadcaster, first host of the Today show
 Tom Keene, host of Bloomberg Surveillance on Bloomberg TV and Bloomberg Radio.
 Roger Kimball (born 1953), no longer a bow-tie wearer, U.S. art critic and social commentator, co-editor and co-publisher of The New Criterion and publisher of Encounter Books
 Janusz Korwin-Mikke (born 1942), Polish liberal conservative publisher and politician
 Irving R. Levine (1922–2009), the first foreign correspondent accredited in the Soviet Union., the former economics reporter for NBC television, known for his "trademark bow tie", appeared for the first time in public wearing a necktie for the Brown University commencement in 1994. "I needed help in tying it," he later said.
 Russell Lynes (1910–1991), American art historian, photographer, author and editor of Harper's Magazine
 Tom Oliphant, writer for the Boston Globe
 Charles Osgood (born 1933), American broadcast journalist, described as having a "trademark bow tie"
 Gene Shalit (born 1926), U.S. film critic and regular commentator on the Today show
 Harry Smith (born 1951), TV journalist, wore a "trademark" bow tie during his early career at a Denver station, but stopped wearing them when he joined CBS in 1987, when a network official told him that Charles Osgood was CBS' bow-tie-wearing personality and "We can't have two guys wearing bow ties."
 Jeffrey Tucker, editorial director of the American Institute for Economic Research
 Timothy White (1952–2002), rock journalist and "debonair dandy who "always wore his bow tie in public" and prided himself in his jaunty bow tie and white buckskin shoes.".
 Tim Wonnacott, English antiques expert and television presenter best known for presenting Bargain Hunt.
 George Will (born 1941), American conservative syndicated columnist and regular on the This Week Sunday morning program on ABC television. He sometimes appears with a bow tie, sometimes with a long tie, as can be seen on the covers of his books. In 2005, he told the New York Times that whenever he wore a regular necktie, people commented on the absence of his bow tie.
 Matthew Winkler, editor-in-chef emeritus of Bloomberg News.

Other entertainment personalities
 Fred Astaire
 Raj Bhakta, 2005 contestant on The Apprentice television program, later ran for Congress and lost
 Bud Collyer, American television game show host in the 1950s and early 1960s, typically wore a bow tie
 Keith Floyd, bon viveur, restaurateur and TV chef
 John Houseman (1902–1988), actor 
 Vladimir Horowitz (1903–1989), pianist, wore a "trademark bow tie."
 Christopher Kimball, cooking writer and TV host
 Alton Brown, Host of the American television show "Good Eats" 
 Matthew Lesko, American author and late-night television personality whose customary garish outfits include bow ties 
 Magician James Randi has frequently worn a bow tie in his public appearances.
 Stromae (Paul Van Haver), Belgian singer-songwriter
 Brendon Urie of Panic! At The Disco is often seen wearing a bow tie to correspond with the historic element in their music.
 Aaron Weinstein is a jazz violinist, mandolinist, arranger, and bow-tie rights activist.

Fashion designers
 Manolo Blahnik, shoe designer, sports a "signature bow tie"
 Alber Elbaz (1961–2021), Israeli fashion designer

Lawyers

 Archibald Cox (1912–2004), the Watergate special prosecutor, constantly wore "his trademark bow tie, neatly knotted as always"
 Edward H. Levi (1911–2000), United States Attorney General, described by The New York Times as looking unready for political combat in "his signature bow tie and thick glasses"
 Louis Lowenstein (1925–2009), professor at Columbia University School of Law
 Henry Rothblatt (1916–1985), author, professor at New York Law School, and defense lawyer whose clients included four of the Watergate burglars, happy hooker Xaviera Hollander, and some soldiers charged in the killing of a reported Vietnamese double-agent. He was described by the Los Angeles Times as "the brash, bow-tied Bronx lawyer."
 John Paul Stevens (1920–2019), U.S. Supreme Court Justice who "rarely, if ever, wears any other neckwear on the bench"
 Joseph N. Welch (1890–1960), head attorney for the U.S. Army in the Army–McCarthy hearings of the 1950s

Politicians and political activists
The regular wearing of bow ties by a politician is often the subject of comment — from friends, foes and journalists:

 Abraham Lincoln, 16th President of the United States
 Charalambos Aristotelous, political scientist - presidential candidate for the Republic of Cyprus
 Thomas J. Bliley, Jr., former U.S. Representative from Virginia
 Earl Blumenauer, U.S. Representative from Oregon, wears "his trademark bow tie"
 Winston Churchill, British statesman, prime minister, Nobel Literature Prize laureate
 Tom Connally, U.S. Senator from Texas
 Adolfo Ruiz Cortines, Mexican politician and president. 
 Lawrence Coughlin, former U.S. Representative from Pennsylvania
 Mo Cowan, U.S. Senator from Massachusetts
 Elio Di Rupo, former Belgian prime minister, once described by a reporter as "the bow tie wearing Socialist"
 Peter Dunne, former New Zealand politician.
 Abdul Kadir Sheikh Fadzir, Malaysian politician and former Member of Parliament. 
 Tom Fink, former Speaker of the Alaska House of Representatives and mayor of Anchorage, Alaska.
 Christian Herter, Governor of Massachusetts, U.S. Secretary of State
 Toomas Hendrik Ilves, president of Estonia, "well-known for always sporting his trademark bow tie"; has even been "dubbed an 'American in a bow tie' by his opponents"

 Stjepan Kljuić, Bosnian politician, former member of tripartite President Council.
 Janusz Korwin-Mikke, a Polish politician
 Karl Lauterbach, a German politician
 Farzad Mostashari, the former National Coordinator for Health Information Technology at the U.S. Department of Health and Human Services.
 Daniel Patrick Moynihan, U.S. Senator from New York, whom Hillary Clinton remembered in a speech as having had "three signature items: his horn rimmed glasses, a bow tie, and a great idea"
 Donald Payne Jr., U.S. Representative from New Jersey
 Lester B. Pearson, Canadian prime minister, Nobel Peace Prize laureate, "with his trademark blue polka dot blue" bow tie
 Otis G. Pike, U.S. Representative from New York
 Franklin D. Roosevelt, 32nd President of the United States
 Theodore Roosevelt, 26th President of the United States
 Wolfgang Schüssel, Austrian Chancellor from 2000 to 2007
 Karel Schwarzenberg, Czech politician, foreign minister
 Ardalan Shekarabi, Swedish politician and minister for public administration.
 George P. Shultz, U.S. Secretary of Labor, the Treasury, and State, consistently wore bow ties in the early 1970s 
 Paul Simon, U.S. senator from Illinois
 Otto Suhr, Governing Mayor of Berlin (mayor of West Berlin) from 1955 to 1957 
 Albert Thomas, former U.S. Representative from Texas
 Donald Tsang, former Chief Executive of Hong Kong  — "The bow tie is such an integral part of Tsang's identity that he is nicknamed "bow tie Tsang," according to an Associated Press story
 Julio César Turbay Ayala, president of Colombia from 1978 to 1982
 Daniel Turp, Canadian Parti Québécois politician, formerly known for wearing bow ties.
 Charlie Vanik, Congressman from Ohio, often wore a bow tie through his tenure in the House
 Getúlio Vargas, Brazilian statesman
 Anthony A. Williams, former mayor of Washington, D.C. and nicknamed "Mr. Bow Tie"
 G. Mennen Williams, former Governor of the State of Michigan.
 Woodrow Wyatt, a British Labour politician, published author, journalist and broadcaster

Psychiatrists and psychologists
 Aaron T. Beck, the psychiatrist known as "the father of cognitive therapy" dresses in "his signature bow tie"
 Alfred Kinsey, the influential sex researcher, wore a "trademark bow tie"
 Theodore Millon (1928–2014), psychologist and expert on personality disorders.

Athletes
 Richard Sherman, Defensive Back of the 2014 Super Bowl Champions Seattle Seahawks is frequently seen wearing a bow tie, and has a YouTube video on how to tie a bow tie. 
 Bruce Bowen, longtime National Basketball Association player for the San Antonio Spurs
 Frank Cashen, longtime Major League Baseball executive with the Baltimore Orioles and New York Mets
 Mike Hawthorn, racing driver, co-winner of the 1955 24 Hours of Le Mans, and 1958 Formula One World Driver's Champion
 Dhani Jones, professional football player, has long worn bow ties and has created a line of bow ties for sale
 Tim Lincecum, pitcher for baseball's San Francisco Giants
 Jim Phelan, basketball coach for Mount St. Mary's University.  Numerous fans and fellow coaches honored his retirement by wearing bow ties.
 Ken Rosenthal, Lead field reporter for Major League Baseball on Fox is known for wearing a wide variety of bow ties.
 Bill Torrey (born 1934), General manager who built the New York Islanders into a dynasty that won four consecutive Stanley Cups, known as "Bow-Tie" Bill, after the signature bow tie he always wore.
 Lee Tressel, college football coach at Baldwin–Wallace College and a hall-of-fame member; described as "a cerebral coach who always wore a bow tie and a buzzcut,"

Other 20th-/21st-century people associated with wearing bow ties

 Saul Bellow, novelist, often wore one late in life.
 Finn M. W. Caspersen, financier, philanthropist, often wore bow ties.
 Brian P. Cleary, award-winning author of more than 50 children's books.
 Aleister Crowley, English occultist, often wore extravagant bow ties.
 Robert Denning, interior designer, wore bow ties exclusively the last fourteen years of his life.
 Louis Farrakhan, Noted anti-Semite and leader of the Nation of Islam organization
 Ace Greenberg, former CEO and Chairman of Bear Stearns
 C. Everett Koop, former U.S. Surgeon General known for his "omnipresent red bow tie"
 Howard Phillips, former spokesman for Nintendo as well as first editor of Nintendo Power magazine from the early 1980s until 1991
 Orville Redenbacher (1907–1995), owner of an American popcorn business who appeared in commercials for it and had his image on the boxes — always wearing horn-rimmed glasses and a bow tie.
 Jim Rogers (born 1942), author
 Albert Schweitzer, German physician, humanitarian, Nobel Peace Prize laureate
 W. Clement Stone (1902–2002), businessman and philanthropist, had a collection of 250 bow ties.
 James Strong, Australian businessman who was CEO of Qantas from 1993 to 2001.
Colonel Sanders (1890–1980), American businessman who founded KFC

Fictional characters
Bow ties are a consistent element in the depiction of some fictional characters.

Characters in film and television

Film and television characters portrayed by human actors as consistently wearing bow ties have included:
 Blaine Anderson, a character in Glee, can frequently be seen wearing a bow tie.
 Chuck Bass, a character in Gossip Girl  known for his dandy sense of style, is often seen sporting a bow tie with a matching pocket square.
 Buckaroo Banzai, titular neurosurgeon, particle physicist, race car driver, rock star and comic book hero from The Adventures of Buckaroo Banzai Across the 8th Dimension, sports a bow tie throughout the film.
 Billy Bunter, a character in the works of Charles Hamilton
 Gil Chesterton, a character on Frasier, was never seen without a bow tie.
 Bertram Cooper, a character in the drama series Mad Men who is never seen without a bow tie.
 The Doctor, central character of Doctor Who, in his second, third and eleventh incarnations; and during his sixth one undercover, and during his tenth and thirteenth ones with their tuxedos.  Actor Matt Smith pressed for the bow tie in his characterisation who regularly declares that "bow ties are cool".
 Richard Gilmore, the patriarch of the Gilmore family on the TV series Gilmore Girls, played by actor Edward Herrmann, was always seen wearing a bow tie.
 Mr. Hooper, Sesame Street character played by Will Lee
 Indiana Jones of the Indiana Jones (franchise) is frequently seen wearing a bow tie with his suit.
 Lurch, the lanky butler for the Addams Family.
 Dr. Donald "Ducky" Mallard, M.D., M.E. the Chief Medical Examiner in NCIS is always seen wearing a bow tie of various colors.
 Michael, the "architect" in The Good Place, played by Ted Danson, usually wears a bow tie except when relevant to the story line to have him without one.
 Brother Mouzone, the enforcer who appears in The Wire television series, wears a "trademark suit and bowtie" and glasses, consistent with his image of being "more like a banker or entrepreneur or scholar" than a hitman.
 Les Nessman, character in WKRP in Cincinnati television sitcom 
 Hercule Poirot, fictional detective
 Sidney Reilly as played by Sam Neill in the BBC television mini-series Reilly, Ace of Spies.
Baxter Stockman wears a bow tie in the 1987 Teenage Mutant Ninja Turtles series.
 Uncle Wally, Sesame Street character played by Bill McCutcheon
 Sheldon Cooper, character in Young Sheldon

Characters in comics, cartoons, and anime
Bow ties are a consistent part of the depiction of many characters created by artists for entertainment media including comics, cartoons, and anime.

Among these are many Hanna-Barbera cartoon characters:
 Mabior Garang de Mabior
 Boo-Boo Bear
 The mouse Pixie and the cat Mr. Jinks in the cartoon Pixie and Dixie and Mr. Jinks
 Magilla Gorilla
 Huckleberry Hound
 Jerry, the mouse in Tom and Jerry (1975–1977)
 Snagglepuss, Hanna-Barbera cartoon character created in 1959, a pink anthropomorphic mountain lion.

Other artist-created characters consistently or frequently depicted in bow ties include:
 In spin-off animated film series My Little Pony: Equestria Girls, Twilight Sparkle wears a pink mini bow tie as a human.
 Bernard Bernoulli of the Maniac Mansion and Day of the Tentacle computer games.
Siblings Caliborn and Calliope from HomestuckHomestuck who used to share a body and thus wear the same bow tie between them.
 Dagwood Bumstead, character in Blondie comic strip
 The Cat in the Hat
 Donald Duck, Disney cartoon character
 Count Duckula always wore a red bow tie as part of his ensemble.
 Conan Edogawa, alias of character Jimmy Kudo in "Detective Conan" manga and anime comics
 Harvey, in the play and film of the same name, the invisible, bow-tied, 6-foot rabbit whose portrait was shown in the play and film with him wearing a bow tie
 Carl Fredricksen, the main character in the 2009 Pixar film, Up. Prior to that, he wore neckties from the 1950s through the 1990s.
 Hoppity Hooper, cartoon character in Jay Ward Productions
 Krusty the Clown, cartoon character in The Simpsons
 Leopold the Cat, the namesake of a Russian cartoon series, wears a bow tie, even when he goes swimming.
 Mickey Mouse
 Octavia Melody, a recurring background character in My Little Pony: Friendship Is Magic, is depicted wearing a pink bow tie with a white collar.
 Mister Peabody, the main character of Peabody's Improbable History.
 Porky Pig, Looney Tunes cartoon character.
 Franklin "Foggy" Nelson. In the Marvel Daredevil comics, Nelson is a lawyer, best friend and longtime business partner of blind lawyer Matthew M. Murdock (a.k.a. the masked vigilante Daredevil). Even though Foggy Nelson occasionally wears standard neckties, he is partial to bow ties.
 Jimmy Olsen often was depicted wearing a bow tie in the comic titles SupermanSuperman and Superman's Pal Jimmy Olsen
 Opus the Penguin, character in Bloom County comic strip
 The Penguin, in the Batman franchise, though some versions of him wear cravats instead such as Batman Returns, Justice League Action, Gotham, and Harley Quinn.
 Simon Petrikov, a character from Adventure Time, wore a red bow tie as part of his suit prior to the Great Mushroom War and his transformation into the Ice King.
 Jack Point, character in Judge Dredd comic books. The bow tie is part of his clown-like clothing.
 Waylon Smithers, cartoon character in The Simpsons
 Moe Szyslak, cartoon character in The Simpsons
 Rich Uncle Pennybags, aka Mr. Monopoly, from the board game Monopoly is frequently shown wearing a bow tie.
 Zatanna, the virtuous sorceress from the DC Universe
 Bill Cipher from Gravity Falls. 
 Professor Porter, the father-in-law for the title character of Tarzan.
 The Master on the Doctor Who episodes Survival and Spyfall.

Notes

Lists of people by activity
Fashion-related lists
Neckwear